Talmage D. Egan is an anesthesiologist, academic, entrepreneur, and author. He is a professor and chair in the department of Anesthesiology, and an adjunct professor in the departments of Pharmaceutics, Bioengineering, and Neurosurgery at the University of Utah School of Medicine.

Egan's research interests revolve around clinical pharmacology investigative methods applied to the development and understanding of novel intravenous anesthetics and opioids, optimal anesthetic drug administration regimens, and anesthetic drug interactions.

Egan served as a board member, treasurer, and president of the International Society for Anaesthetic Pharmacology for many years.

Education
In 1978, Egan graduated from Olympus High School in Salt Lake City. Subsequently, he enrolled at Brigham Young University and completed his undergraduate studies in the humanities. He attended medical school at the University of Utah School of Medicine, graduating in 1986. After completing a preliminary residency in general surgery at the University of Utah in 1988, he pursued postgraduate training in anesthesiology, which he began at the University of Utah and completed at Stanford University in 1991. Following residency, he also completed a fellowship in clinical pharmacology at Stanford. Egan took sabbatical as a visiting scientist at the Imperial College in London, UK in 2000, studying the effects of dexmedotomidine using functional magnetic resonance techniques.

Career
Egan started his academic career as a Clinical Instructor and Assistant Professor for the Department of Anesthesiology at Stanford University. He relocated to the University of Utah as an Assistant Professor in 1993, eventually becoming Professor. Since 2004, he has been a Professor of Anesthesiology, with adjunct positions in the Departments of Pharmaceutics, Bioengineering, and Neurosurgery. Egan served as President of the Medical Staff and Chair of the Medical Board at the University of Utah Health Sciences Center from 2006 to 2008.

Egan has been the Chair of the Department of Anesthesiology since 2015, and is the holder of the K.C. Wong Presidential Endowed Chair in the Department of Anesthesiology at the University of Utah since 2004.

His clinical practice is focused primarily on neuroanesthesia; he served as the chief of neuroanesthesia at the University of Utah for over 10 years.

Egan is the principal creator of Safe Sedation Training (SST), a virtual preceptorship for training non-anesthesia professionals in procedural sedation. He is a founding owner of a medical education and consulting company called Medvis.

Egan served as an associate editor of the scientific journal Anesthesiology from 1999 to 2005 and has served as associate editor of the British Journal of Anaesthesia since 2013.

Research
Egan has authored over 150 publications. A significant part of Egan's work has been focused on drug interactions and computer controlled drug delivery systems. He has worked on developing various methods of total intravenous anesthesia (TIVA), has demonstrated the clinical use of the short acting opioid remifentanil, and defined interactions between intravenous anesthetics i.e., propofol and opioids. Much of his research focuses on the pharmacological and therapeutic principles of sedatives and analgesic drugs.

Personal life 
Talmage married Julie Cook in 1984. They have five children. He is a member of the Church of Jesus Chris of Latter-day Saints (LDS) and served as a volunteer missionary in Sendai, Japan from 1979 to 1981. He later served as a lay pastor (bishop) of a University of Utah LDS student congregation from 2011 to 2014.

Awards and honors
1997 - Teaching Recognition Award, International Anesthesia Research Society
1998 – FAER/Roche Pharmaceuticals Clinical Research Award, Foundation for Anesthesia Education & Research
2001 – Jan Kukral Distinguished Lecturer Award, Northwestern University School of Medicine
2003 – Ralph M. Waters Visiting Professor, University of Wisconsin Medical School
2010 – Ellis Gillespie Keynote Lecturer Award, Australian-New Zealand College of Anaesthetists
2016 – Lifetime Achievement Award, International Society for Anaesthetic Pharmacology
2019 – Highly Commended Book Award, British Medical Association
2022 – Mohamed Naguib Honorary Lecturer, International Society of Anaesthetic Pharmacology
2022 – 52nd Annual E.A. Rovenstine Memorial Lecturer, New York State Society of Anesthesiologists

Bibliography

Books
Anesthesia for the New Millennium (1999) ISBN 978079235632-5
Pharmacology and Physiology for Anesthesia: Foundations and Clinical Application (2013) ISBN 9781437716795
Pharmacology and Physiology for Anesthesia: Foundations and Clinical Application 2nd Edition (2019) ISBN 9780323481106

Selected Articles
Egan, T. D., Lemmens, H. J., Fiset, P., Hermann, D. J., Muir, K. T., Stanski, D. R., & Shafer, S. L. (1993). The pharmacokinetics of the new short-acting opioid remifentanil (GI87084B) in healthy adult male volunteers. Anesthesiology, 79(5), 881-892.
Egan T. D. (1995). Remifentanil pharmacokinetics and pharmacodynamics. A preliminary appraisal. Clinical pharmacokinetics, 29(2), 80–94. , T. D., Minto, C. F., Hermann, D. J., Barr, J., Muir, K. T., & Shafer, S. L. (1996). Remifentanil versus alfentanil: comparative pharmacokinetics and pharmacodynamics in healthy adult male volunteers. Anesthesiology, 84(4), 821-833.
Minto, C. F., Schnider, T. W., Egan, T. D., Youngs, E., Lemmens, H. J., Gambus, P. L., ... & Shafer, S. L. (1997). Influence of age and gender on the pharmacokinetics and pharmacodynamics of remifentanil: I. Model development. Anesthesiology, 86(1), 10-23.
Egan, T. D., Huizinga, B., Gupta, S. K., Jaarsma, R. L., Sperry, R. J., Yee, J. B., & Muir, K. T. (1998). Remifentanil pharmacokinetics in obese versus lean patients. Anesthesiology, 89(3), 562-573.
Egan, T. D., Sharma, A., Ashburn, M. A., Kievit, J., Pace, N. L., & Streisand, J. B. (2000). Multiple dose pharmacokinetics of oral transmucosal fentanyl citrate in healthy volunteers. Anesthesiology, 92(3), 665–673. 
Egan T. D. (2003). Target-controlled drug delivery: progress toward an intravenous "vaporizer" and automated anesthetic administration. Anesthesiology, 99(5), 1214–1219. 
Kern, S. E., Xie, G., White, J. L., & Egan, T. D. (2004). A response surface analysis of propofol-remifentanil pharmacodynamic interaction in volunteers. Anesthesiology, 100(6), 1373–1381. 
Johnson, K. B., Egan, T. D., Kern, S. E., McJames, S. W., Cluff, M. L., & Pace, N. L. (2004). Influence of hemorrhagic shock followed by crystalloid resuscitation on propofol: a pharmacokinetic and pharmacodynamic analysis. Anesthesiology, 101(3), 647–659. 
Egan TD, Obara S, Jenkins TE, Jaw-Tsai SS, Amagasu S, Cook DR, Steffensen SC, Beattie DT. AZD-3043: a novel, metabolically labile sedative-hypnotic agent with rapid and predictable emergence from hypnosis. Anesthesiology. 2012 Jun;116(6):1267-77.
Kim TK, Obara S, Egan TD, Minto CF, La Colla L, Drover DR, Vuyk J, Mertens M; the Remifentanil Pharmacokinetics in Obesity Investigators. Disposition of Remifentanil in Obesity: A New Pharmacokinetic Model Incorporating the Influence of Body Mass. Anesthesiology. 2017;126(6):1019-1032.
Egan TD. Are opioids indispensable for general anaesthesia? Br J Anaesth. 2019;122(6):e127-e135.

References 

Living people
American anesthesiologists
American academics
Brigham Young University alumni
University of Utah School of Medicine alumni
University of Utah School of Medicine faculty
Year of birth missing (living people)
21st-century American physicians